Halwara is a township in Punjab state in India.Located in the Ludhiana  close to Village Sudhar, Halwara lies on the Mullanpur-Raikot road. It is also famous for its Air Base. it is 33 km from Ludhiana 15 km from Mullanpur 6 km from Sadhar.In this town the bypass of Ludhiana also joins Mullanpur-Raikot road. Halwara also boasts the largest military airbase in northern India.

Recently, the government has approved an International Airport at Halwara in 2018 which is expected to be completed within a span of 3 years.

Geographical parts
Halwara consists of Halwara village popularly known as Andloo-Halwara (before partition and even after partition) for the long time and the township that is adjoining mostly around the Air Force Domestic area. It is separated by the Bridge Sadhar township on the Abohar-branch canal. Village Halwara is surrounded with other villages; Aitiana, Rajoana Kalan, Rajoana Khurd, Noorpura, Burj Littan, Kailley, Pakhowal, Andlu, Toose (Toosa), Rattowal, Abbuwal, Sahouli, Sudhar-Township and Sudhar-villagel and Akalgarh and now New Abadi Akalgarh (with separate sarpanch from village Akalgarh). After the partition in 1947 all Muslim families and some Hindu families migrated to Pakistan in different places such as Chakk No.30, Chakk No. 40 JB and Rahim yar khan, chakk no.72/4, Haroonabad and Chakk No. 259 RB/Gurusar, Lyallpur.

Educational institutions
Most people in the village were illiterate, and there was no educational institution. Peer Mubarak Ali donated land for schools in 1906 and schools were constructed by collecting money from the public. In 1912 Primary school and middle school was started under the name 'District Board Middle School.' Later it was up graded up to high School (10th standard) The place boasts of reputed schools, namely, Kendriya Vidyalaya No.1, Kendriya Vidyalaya No. 2, Halwara after partition and increase of population of air force personnel. In nearby town Gurusar Sadhar in 1948 Guru Hargobind Khalsa College came into existence as a degree college. Recently another new educational institution, Shri Guru Ram Dass Management and Educational College, is helping the village students including nearby villages for getting higher education.  There is also Guru Hargobind Khalsa College.

Cultural landscape
Mostly the people of this village were Jatt Sikh mixed with Hindu and only one Muslim Family belonging to Kumhar (Ghumar) was remained in the village a. Other people also used to live like permanent part of the village like Luhar (Blacksmith), Tarkhan, Jhior, Chimba (Weaver), Darji (Tailor), Chamar (Ramdasia) and Majhbi. A Tribal group of Chajjgarhe' living in Jhugies (huts) also living and following Muslim religion. Some of them used to carry on the work called Nakal (Naklan) and singing as their part-time profession to entertain the people on occasions of Marriages and other festivals in the other village and in Halwara village itself. There were seven Maseet or maszid (Mosques) and three Takia (Smoking place) where the Muslim people used to smoke Hukka and gossip in the village. One mosque in the centre of the village was for women. Out of seven mosques 6 are still standing and one mosque is untraceable. Takia place was occupied by a Sikh family named Dalip Singh also known as Daulatpuria but now the same is demolished and a new house is constructed.

Majority of the population was Muslim (Manjh Rajpoot. Muslim women were not allowed to move out of the house ( Parda-nashi). No women was married outside the village but women from outside village were accepted for marriage (nikah). People were converted Muslim from Hindu's  during the regime of Badshah Aurangjeb. They were called Manjh Rajput. Though they accepted Muslim religion but they never forget their Hindu's rituals. At the time of marriage (Nikah), it was compulsory to perform 'Phere' also. Otherwise marriage ceremony was not consider completed. Beef for them was sin and they never sacrificed cow on any occasions. They used to celebrate marriage functions 10 to 15 days. They were fond of music, Qawwalis and Ghazals were continuously performed for many days during marriage ceremony.

The place is a remarkable example of cultural harmony and intermingling. A large number of people from other states belonging to families of Air Force men and women have settled here. The area has are Sikh Gurudwaras, a Hindu temple, a Christian church, and the tomb of a Muslim peer, all of which are equally revered by the residents.

Heritage havelies in Halwara Village
Ghode wali Haveli (Horse wali Haveli) is one old heritage haveli still existing. It is called so because the original owner used to climb up the stairs on his horse. Legend goes that he had built the ground floor, but then filled it with mud and build the present structure on top of it. It has its own well to fetch the water inside the forward courtyard above the height of ground floor. The owner of this haveli was Sardar Rai Muhammad Ahmad Khan, Father of Sardar Rai Muhammad Aslam Khan. Rai Aslam Khan later migrated to Pakistan after partition and his family still lives in mauza Adam Sahaba Rahimyar Khan district of Punjab, Pakistan. Even nowadays this Haveli is in good condition. The current owner Sr B.S.Grewal is planning to renovate this Haveli and try to get it into its original shape. If the original owners have any photographs/ paintings or information please contact on e mail The Rajputs of HALWARA migrated to Pakistan. Now they live in Chak No 259 RB/ GURUSSAR, Lyallpur, Punjab, Pakistan, and Chak 40 JB And Rahim Yar Khan and Chak no 72/4-R.  haroonabad, Punjab, Pakistan. There is another building here 'Heera Singh Di Haveli' which was built (completed) on 25.02.1941 by a Muslim Faqir Mohd Khan son of Isa Khan situated at Ludhiana - Raikot road. After migration of Faqir Mohd Khan to Pakistan at the time of partition the same was occupied by a Sikh Hira Singh who is died now and the building is vacant but sold to a villager.

External links
 Halwara Air Base - globalsecurity.org

Cities and towns in Ludhiana district